Drongan, Stair and Rankinston was one of 32 electoral wards of East Ayrshire Council. Created in 1999, the ward elected one councillor using the first-past-the-post voting electoral system.

The ward was a Labour Co-operative stronghold as the party successfully held the seat at every election. Thomas Farrell was the only councillor elected as he represented the ward from 1999 to 2007.

In 2007, the ward was abolished and replaced by the multi-member Doon Valley ward as council elections moved to a proportional voting system – the single transferable vote – following the implementation of the Local Governance (Scotland) Act 2004.

Boundaries
The Drongan, Stair and Rankinston ward was created in 1999 by the Third Statutory Reviews of Electoral Arrangements from the previous Drongan, Ochiltree, Rankinston and Stair ward and a small area of the Patna and Dalrymple ward. The ward took in a rural area around the villages of Drongan, Rankinston and Stair and took in an area in the west of East Ayrshire next to its border with South Ayrshire Council. In 2007, the ward was abolished as the Local Governance (Scotland) Act 2004 saw proportional representation and new multi-member wards introduced. The majority of the area covered by the Drongan, Stair and Rankinston ward was placed into the new Doon Valley ward and an area in the east of the ward was placed in the Cumnock and New Cumnock ward.

Councillors

Election results

2003 election

1999 election

References

Wards of East Ayrshire